Pierre Bullet (c. 1639 – 1716) was a French architect. He was one of the students of François Blondel.

Among his works are the Château de Champs-sur-Marne, and Porte Saint-Martin.

References 

1639 births
Architects from Paris
1716 deaths
17th-century French architects
Members of the Académie royale d'architecture